The 2008 Queensland Cup season was the 13th season of Queensland's premier rugby league competition.

Regular season
All times are in AEST (UTC+10:00) on the relevant dates.

Round 1

Round 2

Round 3

Round 4

Round 5

Round 6

Round 7

Round 8

Round 9

Round 10

Round 11

Round 12

Round 13

Round 14

Round 15

Round 16

Round 17

Round 18

Round 19

Round 20

Round 21

Round 22

References

2008 in Australian rugby league
Queensland Cup